Naresh ( Nareśa: nara "man" and īśa "lord") is a word popularly used among Hindus as a given name.

Naresh may refer to:

People

Given name
 Naresh (actor) (born 1960), Indian movie actor in Tollywood
 Naresh Bhandari, Nepalese politician
 Naresh Bhardwaj (born 1959), Canadian politician
 Naresh Dadhich (physicist), (born 1944), theoretical physicist
 Naresh Dalal, physical chemist 
 Naresh Goyal (born 1949), Indian businessman
 Naresh Gujral (born 1948), Indian politician
 Naresh Iyer (born 1981), Indian singer
 Naresh Kamboj (born 1964), Indian politician
 Naresh Mehta (1922–2000), Hindi writer
 Naresh Sohal (1939–2018), Indian composer
 Naresh Trehan (born 1946), Indian surgeon
 Naresh Kumar (tennis) (1928–2022), tennis player

Surname
 Allari Naresh (born 1982), Indian movie actor who works in Tollywood

See also
 Ramnaresh Sarwan (born 1980), West Indian cricketer

Places
 Naresh (city), city in Babylonia, situated near Sura on a canal

Indian given names